Torre Pellice (Vivaro-Alpine: La Torre de Pèlis) is a comune (municipality) in the Metropolitan City of Turin in the Italian region Piedmont, located about  southwest of Turin. It is crossed by the Pellice river.

Torre Pellice is the centre of the Waldensian church. The Waldensians arrived in the valley in the early 13th century. In a grotto nearby Torre Pellice they held the Synod of Chanforan, by which they adhered to the Protestant Reformation (1590).

It borders the municipalities of Angrogna, Villar Pellice, Luserna San Giovanni, and Rorà.

Notable residents 
 John Charles Beckwith (British Army officer)

Twin towns 
 Guardia Piemontese, Italy
 Valdese, North Carolina, United States

References